David Lawrence (Rayne, May 5, 1959 – Cremona, March 20, 2017) was an American basketball player. He was a star college player at McNeese State University, a second round draft pick in the 1980 NBA draft, and played professionally in Europe for nine seasons.

Lawrence, a 6'9" power forward from W. O. Boston High School in Lake Charles, Louisiana, played for McNeese State from 1976 to 1980, following his brother Edmund to the school. Over four years, he scored 1,938 points and grabbed 1,026 rebounds. He was named first-team All-Southland Conference and was the Southland Conference Player of the Year as a junior in 1979.

Following his college career, Lawrence was drafted in the second round (32nd pick overall) of the 1980 NBA draft by the Portland Trail Blazers. Though he never played in the National Basketball Association (NBA), he played for nine years in the top leagues of Italy, Spain and the Netherlands.

Lawrence died on March 20, 2017.

References

External links
McNeese State Athletic HOF profile

1959 births
2017 deaths
American expatriate basketball people in Italy
American expatriate basketball people in the Netherlands
American expatriate basketball people in Spain
American men's basketball players
Basket Mestre 1958 players
Basketball players from Louisiana
Heroes Den Bosch players
Donar (basketball club) players
Liga ACB players
McNeese Cowboys basketball players
Pallacanestro Trieste players
Portland Trail Blazers draft picks
Power forwards (basketball)
Saski Baskonia players
Sportspeople from Lake Charles, Louisiana